The 2012 Trophée Éric Bompard the fifth event of six in the 2012–13 ISU Grand Prix of Figure Skating, a senior-level international invitational competition series. It was held at the Palais Omnisports de Paris Bercy in Paris on November 15–18. Medals were awarded in the disciplines of men's singles, ladies' singles, pair skating, and ice dancing. Skaters earned points toward qualifying for the 2012–13 Grand Prix Final.

Eligibility
Skaters who reached the age of 14 by July 1, 2012 were eligible to compete on the senior Grand Prix circuit.

Prior to competing in a Grand Prix event, skaters were required to have earned the following scores (3/5 of the top scores at the 2012 World Championships):

Entries
The entries were as follows.

Italy's Carolina Kostner withdrew from the ladies' event due to insufficient fitness, the United States' Johnny Weir withdrew due to a right hip injury, and Germany's Aliona Savchenko / Robin Szolkowy withdrew as a result of Savchenko's severe sinus infection.

Overview
Jeremy Abbott of the United States was first in the men's short program, followed by Japan's Takahito Mura and France's Brian Joubert. Mura was also second in the free skating but finished first overall and took his first Grand Prix title, while Abbott took silver, and France's Florent Amodio – 7th in the short – won the segment and rose to third overall. Jorik Hendrickx withdrew before the free skating due to a twisted ankle in an off-ice warm up.

Despite spraining her right ankle before the start of the competition, Russia's Yulia Lipnitskaya placed first in the ladies' short program ahead of the United States' Ashley Wagner and Russia's Elizaveta Tuktamysheva. Wagner won the free skating and her second Grand Prix title, Tuktamysheva rose to take the silver, and Lipnitskaia finished with the bronze.

Russia's Yuko Kavaguti / Alexander Smirnov won the pairs' short program by over four points ahead of Canada's Meagan Duhamel / Eric Radford, with China's Peng Cheng / Zhang Hao in third. Kavaguti / Smirnov were second in the free skating but their lead from the short program took them to the gold medal, Duhamel / Radford were first in the free skating and finished second overall, and Italy's Stefania Berton / Ondrej Hotarek rose to take the bronze medal despite placing 5th in the segment.

France's Nathalie Pechalat were first in the short dance, followed by Italy's Anna Cappellini / Luca Lanotte and Russia's Ekaterina Riazanova / Ilia Tkachenko. In the free dance, Pechalat / Bourzat maintained their lead and won the gold medal, Cappellini / Lanotte were fourth in the segment but held on to second place overall, and Riazanova / Tkachenko finished in third.

Results

Men

Ladies

Pairs

Ice dancing

References

External links

 Entries
 Detailed results

Trophée Éric Bompard, 2012
Internationaux de France
Figure
Figure skating in Paris
International figure skating competitions hosted by France
November 2012 sports events in France